Ellen Jane Langer (born March 25, 1947) is an American professor of psychology at Harvard University;  in 1981, she became the first woman ever to be tenured in psychology at Harvard. Langer studies the illusion of control, decision-making, aging, and mindfulness theory. Her most influential work is Counterclockwise, published in 2009, which answers questions about aging from her research and interest in the particulars of aging across the nation.

Early life and education 
Langer was born in The Bronx, New York. She received a bachelor's degree in psychology from New York University, and her PhD in Social and Clinical Psychology from Yale University in 1974.

Career 

Langer has had a significant influence on the positive psychology movement. Along with being known as the mother of positive psychology, her contributions to the study of mindfulness have earned her the moniker of the "mother of mindfulness." Her work helped to presage mind/body medicine which has been regarded by many scientists to be an important intellectual movement and one that now has "considerable evidence that an array of mind-body therapies can be used as effective adjuncts to conventional medical treatment." 

She has published over 200 articles and academic texts, was published in The New York Times, and discussed her works on Good Morning America. Additionally, in many introductory psychology courses at universities across the United States, her studies are required reading.

Aging 

Langer and colleagues have conducted multiple forms of research to promote the flexibility of aging. Some of her most impactful work has been her pioneering research on her famous Counterclockwise Study (1979). This study was originally published by Oxford University Press and later described in her best seller, Mindfulness. It is the basis of what is now called Reminiscence Therapy. The study was replicated in England, South Korea and the Netherlands and was the basis of a British Academy of Film and Television Awards nominated BBC series, The Young Ones.  

Other important work has shown that rewarding behaviors and following completion of memory tasks improves memory. Another study showed that simply taking care of a plant improves mental and physical health, as well as life expectancy. These studies were the primitive steps to creating the Langer Mindfulness Scale. Her research provided for improved methods in nursing homes and assisted living facilities. Langer demonstrated the benefits of mind/body unity theory. By having chambermaids call their everyday activity “exercise” rather than “labor,” Langer found that the chambermaids experienced a myriad of health benefits including: "a decrease in their systolic blood pressure, weight, and waist-to-hip ratio — and a 10 percent drop in blood pressure."

Mindfulness
Langer is well known for her contributions to the study of mindfulness and of mindless behaviour, with these contributions having provided the basis for many studies focused on individual differences in unconscious behavior and decision-making processes in humans. In 1989, she published Mindfulness, her first book, and some have referred to her as the "mother of mindfulness". In an interview with Krista Tippett on the National Public Radio program "On Being," broadcast on Sept. 13, 2015, Langer defined mindfulness as "the simple act of noticing new things."

Awards 
In 1980, she was the recipient of a Guggenheim Fellowship. Other honors include the Award for Distinguished Contributions to Psychology in the Public Interest of the American Psychological Association, the Liberty Science Center Genius Award, the Distinguished Contributions of Basic Science to Applied Psychology award from the American Association of Applied and Preventive Psychology, the James McKeen Cattel Award, and the Gordon Allport Intergroup Relations Prize.

Criticism 
Her finding that taking care of a plant significantly improved health outcomes in nursing home patients was shown to be the result of a statistical error. In one of her famous "counterclockwise" studies, Langer claimed that when elderly men were temporarily placed in a setting that recreated their past, their health improved, and they even looked younger. However, this study was never published in a peer-reviewed journal.
The only publication of this finding is in a chapter of a book edited by Langer.

In a 2014 New York Times Magazine profile, Langer described the week-long paid adult counterclockwise retreats she was creating in San Miguel de Allende, Mexico, aimed towards replicating the effects found in her New Hampshire study. According to the article, "Langer makes no apologies for the paid retreats, nor for what will be their steep price." Langer was defiant when pressed on the ethics of her study:

"To my question of whether such a nakedly commercial venture will undermine her academic credibility, Langer rolled her eyes a bit. 'Look, I’m not 40 years old. I’ve paid my dues, and there’s nothing wrong with making this more widely available to people, since I deeply believe it.'"

Bibliography (selection)

References

External links

 Personal site
 Mind Changers, Series 4: Arden House BBC Radio programme which interviews Langer about one of her experiments.
 The Young Ones Ellen Langer's Counter Clockwise study was the basis for this BBC documentary series.
 The Great Lesson The Great Lesson: A New Film About Mind and Body: Featuring Dr. Ellen Langer

21st-century American psychologists
American women psychologists
American social psychologists
Harvard Extension School faculty
Yale University alumni
Mindfulness (psychology)
1947 births
Living people
American women academics
21st-century American women
20th-century American psychologists